Mary Anne Coughlan (born 28 May 1965) is an Irish former Fianna Fáil politician who served as Tánaiste from 2008 to 2011, Deputy Leader of Fianna Fáil from 2008 to 2011, Minister for Health and Children from January 2011 to March 2011, Minister for Education and Skills from 2010 to 2011, Minister for Enterprise, Trade and Employment from 2008 to 2010, Minister for Agriculture, Fisheries, and Food from 2004 to 2008, Minister for Social and Family Affairs from 2002 to 2004 and Minister of State for the Gaeltacht and the Islands from 2001 to 2002. She served as a Teachta Dála (TD) for the Donegal South-West constituency from 1987 to 2011.

Early life
Coughlan was born in Donegal town in the south of County Donegal in 1965. Her father was Cathal Coughlan, a Fianna Fáil TD, who died in office in June 1986. She was educated at the Ursuline Convent in Sligo, where she was a boarder from 1978 to 1983 and later at University College Dublin, graduating with a Social Science degree. She worked as a social worker for a brief period before becoming involved in politics.

Political career

Early political life
Coming from a political family, Coughlan was always interested in politics, and joined a local party branch at the age of 16. She was first elected to Dáil Éireann at the 1987 general election as a Fianna Fáil TD for the Donegal South-West constituency. At the age of 21 years and nine months, Coughlan was the youngest member of the 25th Dáil. Her uncle Clement Coughlan was a TD from 1980 until his death in 1983 in a road traffic accident, while her father Cathal Coughlan was a TD from 1983 to 1986 when he died after a short illness. The death of her father resulted in Coughlan being co-opted onto Donegal County Council in 1986, which launched her own political career.

She remained on the backbenches of the Dáil for the first thirteen years of her career as a TD, before being appointed a junior Minister. During this period she served on a number of Oireachtas committees, including the Joint Committee on Tourism, Sport and Recreation and the Joint Committee on the Irish language where she served as chairperson. Coughlan was also a member of the British-Irish Parliamentary Body. In 1994, Bertie Ahern became leader of Fianna Fáil and Leader of the Opposition. In early 1995 he named his new front bench, including Coughlan as Spokesperson on Educational Reform. She served in this position until 1997 but was not included in the cabinet or junior ministerial team when the party came to power.

Minister of State
In February 2001, Coughlan was appointed as Minister of State at the Department of Arts, Heritage, Gaeltacht and the Islands, with responsibility for the Gaeltacht and Islands. In this role for just sixteen months, she was responsible for securing Government approval for the general scheme of the Official Languages Equality Bill, which aimed to confirm the language rights of citizens and outline their rights when dealing with the State in either official language. She also oversaw the coming-into-force of an amended Gaeltacht Housing Act, updating the supports available for Irish-speaking households building in or moving to the Gaeltacht. The Commission on Irish in the Gaeltacht also completed its work under her guidance and Coughlan saw its report approved and published. During her time in this role, she also established a Working Group on the Creation of Employment in the Gaeltacht. In addition, during her tenure Coughlan oversaw significant investment in island infrastructure and in the connection of islands to the national electricity grid, including Inishbofin Island, off the County Donegal coast, which was connected for the first time in 2002 by using an underwater cable from the mainland.

Cabinet career (2002–2011)

Minister for Social and Family Affairs (2002–2004)
After the 2002 general election Coughlan was promoted to the cabinet as Minister for Social and Family Affairs. Her time in Social and Family Affairs saw increases in social welfare payments and the extension of family supports. She established the Family Support Agency with a mandate to support families, promote stability in family life, prevent marital breakdown and foster a supportive community environment for families at a local level.

Coughlan received criticism for changes she made regarding the availability of rent supplement. This was portrayed as targeting the weaker sections of society at a time when the Irish economy was reasonably strong. She was also widely criticised for cuts she made as Minister to entitlements for widows and widowers after the death of a spouse. The cuts were part of a wider drive for a reduction in government spending in autumn 2002. However, many considered these and other similar cutbacks to have been forced upon her by Charlie McCreevy, who was Minister for Finance at the time, and who was blamed for many of his decisions. She was also involved in resolving a dispute over payments with the country's dentists.

During her time as Minister for Social and Family Affairs, Coughlan was praised for introducing large increases in child benefit and in pensions. Her work on the pensions element of her portfolio also saw her introduce Personal Retirement Savings Accounts. Coughlan also established the Office of the Pensions Ombudsman and provided additional funding and support for the State's Money Advice and Budgeting Service (MABS).

Minister for Agriculture, Fisheries and Food (2004–2008)
In a 2004 reshuffle, Coughlan succeeded Joe Walsh as Minister for Agriculture and Food, becoming the first woman to hold that portfolio in Ireland.

During her time in this role the country's last two remaining sugar factories, owned by Greencore, were closed. The Carlow factory closed on 11 March 2005. Mallow, Ireland's last sugar factory to remain open, closed on 12 May 2006, after operating for 77 years. Farmers and others were critical of the decision. They criticised the government's and the Minister's roles, both were seen as not doing enough to try to stop the closures, though they had retained some control over the factories since they had been privatised a number of years before. As sugar beet growers now had nowhere to sell their sugar beet, cultivation of the crop ceased in Ireland. Coughlan also headed this department at a time when the spread of bird flu from abroad looked very likely to occur, especially in 2006.

Coughlan was re-appointed to the portfolio on 14 June 2007 following the 2007 general election, with the additional responsibility of fisheries as Minister for Agriculture, Fisheries and Food. Shortly after her re-appointment Coughlan had to put in place measures to deal with the threat of the potential spread of foot-and-mouth disease from Britain in early August 2007.

Throughout her time in this ministry, Coughlan was involved in ongoing WTO trade talks. During these trade talks, in which Irish agriculture was threatened by attacks on EU farm subsidies and free access to EU markets, she formed an alliance with French ministers to resist the proposals.

Tánaiste and Minister for Enterprise, Trade and Employment (2008–2010)
Following Bertie Ahern's resignation on 6 May 2008, Coughlan, in a cabinet re-shuffle, became Tánaiste and Minister for Enterprise, Trade and Employment on 7 May 2008, by newly appointed Taoiseach Brian Cowen.

As a proponent of the Treaty of Lisbon, Coughlan was noted to have "quietly withdrawn" from the first referendum campaign after she embarrassed the Government in a radio interview by not knowing the number of European Commissioners. Over a period of four days Coughlan stated that the EU's larger nations still had two Commissioners each. In fact, the bigger states had lost their second places on the Commission in 2004. According to an editorial in The Irish Times, "how someone who had spent several years around an EU Council of Ministers' table could not know that is extraordinary".

Responding to a row over medical cards she displayed insufficient mathematical skill, saying "Of the savings of €100 million, €86 million is for GPs and €30 million is for pharmacists".

Her performance as Tánaiste in defence of the October 2008 budget was criticised by opposition politicians and the media, with Fine Gael's Leo Varadkar publicly comparing Coughlan to gaffe-prone Alaskan Governor Sarah Palin. Varadkar's comments were challenged by broadcaster John Bowman and Sunday Tribune journalist Justine McCarthy, as well as by Coughlan herself.

Coughlan announced a third change in the budgetary position, in her local constituency, prior to Cabinet agreement and five days before the responsible Minister for Social and Family Affairs announced it to the nation, via RTÉ Radio.

Coughlan acted to clean up years of wasteful spending by executives at the state training and employment agency, FÁS, and was considered to have taken a tough line with Director General, Rody Molloy, who was forced to resign in November 2008.

The 2008 fall in the value of sterling against the euro saw the price gap between North and South widen and shoppers cross to Northern Ireland to the detriment of businesses in the South. Coughlan asked multiple retailers to reduce their margins south of the border and provide better value to consumers in the South. Research from Forfás, concluded that only a five per cent difference in the cost of goods between North and South was justifiable. The findings highlighted retailers' larger margins in the South in relation to their operations in the North and Coughlan queried why the price differential in many identical goods was substantially in excess of 5%. Coughlan said: "I don't own a shop. The Government doesn't own a shop. It's up to Tesco, it's up to Superquinn, it's up to Aldi, it's up to Lidl; it's up to them to cut their prices. They need to ensure that that happens; they have to do something about it." When retailers continued to remain silent on the price differential, Coughlan sent in the Competition Authority to investigate supply chains in the retail sector.

Coughlan was condemned for doing "too little too late" in relation to large-scale loss of employment at a Dell facility in Limerick, despite successfully retaining 2,000 Dell employees in Ireland. She also successfully secured over €22 million of European Globalisation Adjustment Fund money to the benefit of the workers made redundant in Limerick.

Coughlan was accused by an opposition spokesperson of being unable to debate exchequer figures.

Coughlan acted to close loopholes in company law that made it possible for bank directors not to have to disclose the full extent of their indebtedness to the bank in its published accounts. She also strengthened the powers of the Director of Corporate Enforcement to enforce company law provisions.

On 24 April 2009, one of Coughlan's demoted junior ministers, John McGuinness, criticised Coughlan and Cowen for the lack of leadership being given to the country, saying: "She's not equipped to deal with the complex issues of dealing with enterprise and business within the department. And neither is the department". McGuinness' credibility was subsequently undermined when it was revealed that he had hired external PR advice in an effort to undermine Coughlan and enhance his own profile as a Minister of State within her department.

In April 2009, she denied there would be a supplementary budget – one was announced five days later – also claiming that the public finances were under control at the same time.

In September that year Coughlan was described as Calamity Coughlan, having been left red-faced after erroneously referring to the theory of evolution as having been formulated by Einstein. Later that month she apparently let slip the date of a general election while speaking about the budget when Brian Cowen was in New York. She also called her Green Party colleagues "" – Irish language for "the vegetables".

Minister for Education and Skills (2010–2011)
On 23 March 2010, as part of a cabinet reshuffle, she was appointed as Minister for Education and Skills, while retaining the position of Tánaiste. One of Coughlan's first initiatives in the portfolio was to voice her support for the introduction of a CAO points bonus for students studying higher level maths. She revamped the Student Maintenance Grant application procedure, streamlining administration and getting the scheme out two months earlier than in previous years. Following the resignation of Mary Harney in January 2011, Coughlan was also appointed as Minister for Health and Children.

Loss of seat
At the 2011 general election, Coughlan lost her seat to Independent candidate Thomas Pringle. Her first preference vote more than halved from 26.5% in 2007 to just over 11%. Her running mate Brian Ó Domhnaill also failed to be elected, leaving Donegal South-West without a Fianna Fáil TD for the first time in its history. The loss of her seat was considered the most high-profile casualty of the Fianna Fáil meltdown. The Guardian newspaper described it as "Ireland's Portillo moment". Coughlan received a lump sum of €237,000, and an annual pension of €140,000.

Views on LGBT rights
During her time as Minister for Social and Family Affairs, Coughlan became involved in a number of LGBT rights controversies. In March 2004, she introduced the Social Welfare Amendment Act 2004 in response to a case involving same-sex partner benefits. Under the Equal Status Act 2000, a gay pensioner successfully petitioned the Equality Authority to allow his male partner to travel as his 'spouse' using the pensioner's travel pass. The legislation which Coughlan subsequently produced limited the meaning of the word 'spouse' to include only married couples; this was regarded by the Opposition parties and LGBT rights campaigners as discriminatory towards same-sex couples as there had been no legal recognition of same-sex unions in the Republic of Ireland at the time. Two months later, Coughlan caused comment at a European Union conference on family and social policy by stating that Ireland would never be ready for same-sex marriage or gay adoption.

During her time in Social and Family Affairs, Coughlan produced a report discussing new definitions of 'the family' which recommended a more progressive approach to the matter. This influenced the government's 2008 civil union legislation.

Personal life
Mary Coughlan was married to David Charlton, a Garda who lost a leg in a serious car accident a few years after they were married, from 1991 until his death from cancer on 2 September 2012. They were married when Coughlan was aged 26, two years after they met, David was working as a Garda on duty at Leinster House at the time. They have two children, one son and one daughter. They lived at Frosses, a village just west of Donegal town. Coughlan is a fluent Irish speaker. She has served as secretary of the St Naul's GAA club.

References

External links
What Brian and Mary did next

1965 births
Living people
Alumni of University College Dublin
Mary
Fianna Fáil TDs
Gaelic games club administrators
Local councillors in County Donegal
Members of the 25th Dáil
Members of the 26th Dáil
Members of the 27th Dáil
Members of the 28th Dáil
Members of the 29th Dáil
Members of the 30th Dáil
Ministers for Agriculture (Ireland)
Ministers for Education (Ireland)
Ministers for Enterprise, Trade and Employment
Ministers for Health (Ireland)
Ministers for Social Affairs (Ireland)
Ministers of State of the 28th Dáil
Politicians from County Donegal
Women government ministers of the Republic of Ireland
Women ministers of state of the Republic of Ireland
20th-century women Teachtaí Dála
21st-century women Teachtaí Dála